Route 787, or Highway 787, may refer to:

Canada
Saskatchewan Highway 787

United States